The 1900–01 Syracuse Orangemen basketball team represented Syracuse University during the 1900–01 college men's basketball season. It was their first season of varsity basketball. There was no coach; instead captain Bill Lowe headed the team's operations.

Schedule

|-

Source

Roster
Clinton Goodwin
Courtney Whittemore
Earl Twombley
George Lamb
Bill Lowe
Avery Gannett
Harley Crane

References

External links
 OrangeHoops.com recap of 1900–01 season

Syracuse
Syracuse Orange men's basketball seasons
Syracuse Orangemen Basketball Team
Syracuse Orangemen Basketball Team